This is a partial list of football clubs in Federated States of Micronesia

Island Pitbulls Football Club
Island Warriors Football Club
Seventh-Day Adventist United Club Football
International (Inter) Football Club
Island Chihuahuas Football Club
College of Micronesia Football Club
Nett Club de Futbol
U Football Club
Kolonia Football Club
Madolenihmw Football Club
Yap Football Club
Fanif Football Club

Micronesia
 
Lists of organizations based in the Federated States of Micronesia
Football clubs